is a Japanese professional wrestler signed to New Japan Pro-Wrestling (NJPW), where he is the leader of the Los Ingobernables de Japón faction.

Tetsuya Naito began training for a professional wrestling career in 2000, initially under Animal Hamaguchi before joining NJPW in 2004, where he underwent further training. He is a former NEVER Openweight Champion, and a former IWGP Tag Team and IWGP Junior Heavyweight Tag Team Championship with former No Limit partner Yujiro Takahashi. In addition, Naito is the winner of the 2013 and 2017 editions of the G1 Climax, NJPW's premier singles tournament, and of the 2016 New Japan Cup. Regarded as one of the most popular and successful wrestlers in NJPW history, In 2016 and 2017, Tokyo Sports awarded Naito with the MVP Award, the publication's highest honor. In 2020, Naito became the first person to hold both the IWGP Heavyweight and Intercontinental Championships at the same time, accomplishing that feat twice, becoming a three-time IWGP Heavyweight and record six-time IWGP Intercontinental Champion. In addition, he is the only person to successfully win back the double gold, winning them back at Summer Struggle in Jingu.

Professional wrestling career 
Naito began training for a professional wrestling career in 2000, initially under Animal Hamaguchi. In 2004 he won the "Takeda Dojo Submission" tournament, which landed him a contract with New Japan Pro-Wrestling (NJPW) to train in their dojo.

New Japan Pro-Wrestling (2005–2009) 
On November 3, 2005, Tetsuya passed a public audition held by NJPW in Korakuen Hall, graduating from the dojo and earning a spot on the promotion's roster. After half a year of further training, Naito wrestled his debut match on May 27, 2006, losing to Takashi Uwano. He picked up his first win on October 29 over Mitsuhide Hirasawa. In 2007 Naito participated in the 2007 Best of the Super Juniors tournament, replacing a wrestler who was unable to compete due to injuries. Tetsuya finished last in Block B, earning four points by defeating Gedo and El Samurai, losing the other four matches in his block.

In February 2008, Naito formed a tag team with fellow rookie Yujiro Takahashi called "No Limit". In March, the two went to fifteen-minute time limit draws with former IWGP Junior Heavyweight Tag Team Championship teams such as Koji Kanemoto and Wataru Inoue, and Minoru and Prince Devitt, and Yujiro pinned veteran Super Strong Machine in a trios match. All of this led to a junior tag title challenge for the duo, facing Machine's Legend stablemates Jyushin Thunder Liger and Akira, in which No Limit came up short when Akira pinned Tetsuya. Yujiro would then participate in the ongoing feud between New Japan and Pro Wrestling Zero1, teaming with Koji Kanemoto and Manabu Nakanishi in two separate tag team matches, losing to Zero1's Masato Tanaka and Tatsuhito Takaiwa in the former, and defeating Takao Omori and Osamu Namiguchi in the latter.

In May 2008, Yujiro and Tetsuya underwent a five-match series with some of New Japan's top tag teams, dubbed "No Limit Generation Smash", held in the various Zepp clubs across Japan. The teams included Jado and Gedo, Togi Makabe and Toru Yano, Wataru Inoue and Koji Kanemoto, Shinsuke Nakamura and Hirooki Goto, and Yuji Nagata and Manabu Nakanishi. No Limit lost all five matches. A special sixth match in the series took place in Zero1 on May 29, 2008, Yujiro and Tetsuya defeated Zero1's Osamu Namiguchi and Shito Ueda. In June 2008, Yujiro entered the Best of the Super Juniors tournament, going winless in his first four matches before defeating Minoru in his final bout to finish with two points. The following month, Tetsuya and Yujiro participated in a single-elimination tournament to decide the new holder of the recently vacated IWGP Junior Heavyweight title. Naito lost to Yujiro in the first round of the tournament. On October 13, 2008, at Destruction '08 Yujiro and Tetsuya defeated Devitt and Minoru to win the IWGP Junior Heavyweight Tag Team Championship. On January 4, 2009, at Wrestle Kingdom III in Tokyo Dome The Motor City Machine Guns of Alex Shelley and Chris Sabin defeated them to win the tag team title.

Total Nonstop Action Wrestling (2009) 
Shortly after losing the IWGP Junior Heavyweight Tag Team Championship Yujiro and Tetsuya traveled to North America for a "developmental tour", something often done with young Japanese wrestlers to expose them to other styles of wrestling and help them develop into better wrestlers. No Limit worked mainly for Total Nonstop Action Wrestling (TNA), while also making an appearance for both Team 3D's wrestling academy and Jersey All Pro Wrestling, although Naito wasn't able to wrestle in JAPW due to an injury and was replaced by the team's TNA ally Sheik Abdul Bashir. Yujiro and Naito worked for TNA approximately two months, receiving another unsuccessful shot at the IWGP Junior Heavyweight Tag Team Championship. No Limit's final appearance for TNA was a handicap match on the May 14, 2009, edition of Impact! against Kevin Nash, which the team lost.

Consejo Mundial de Lucha Libre (2009–2010) 
No Limit made their debut for Consejo Mundial de Lucha Libre (CMLL) in Mexico City, Mexico on May 29, 2009 teaming with Dos Caras Jr. to defeat Héctor Garza, La Sombra and Volador Jr. No Limit were presented as "Anti-Mexican" heels ("bad guys") and soon began teaming with Okumura under the team name La Ola Amarilla (Spanish for "The Yellow Wave"), in matches against Mexicans.

On July 10, 2009 No Limit teamed with Black Warrior to defeat the team of Héctor Garza, Toscano and El Sagrado, After the match Black Warrior made a challenge on behalf of Yujiro  (as Yujiro does not speak Spanish) for a "hair vs. hair" match with Garza. This led to all men being involved in a 15-man steel cage Luchas de Apuestas match at Infierno en el Ring that Tetsuya won by pinning Toscano, forcing him to have his hair shaved off. Following the match No Limit's focus was on Black Warrior, who had turned on them during the cage match. When Jyushin Thunder Liger toured Mexico in September, 2009 he joined the "Anti-Mexico" faction, teaming with No Limit and Okumura to defeat Team Mexico (Último Guerrero, Atlantis, Black Warrior and Héctor Garza) at the CMLL 76th Anniversary Show on September 18, 2009. The following week Yujio teamed with Okumura to win the 2009 Gran Alternativa tournament, defeating Toscano and Rouge in the first round, Héctor Garza and Ángel de Plata in the second round and Místico and Ángel de Oro in the finals. The storyline feud between No Limit and Black Warrior reached its conclusion on October 16, 2009 as Black Warrior faced Yujiro in a Lucha de Apuesta, hair vs. hair match that Yujiro won two falls to one, forcing Black Warrior to have his hair shaved off after the match.

After the storyline with Black Warrior ended, No Limit began working with the team of El Texano Jr. and El Terrible in a feud that led to a Lucha de Apuesta hair vs. hair match between the two teams that was the main event of CMLL's Sin Salida show on December 4, 2009. After being successful throughout the summer and fall No Limit finally lost to Texano Jr. and Terrible at Sin Salida and were both shaved completely bald after the match per Lucha Libre traditions. While Yujiro has not returned to CMLL since their return to NJPW on January 4, 2010 Naito returned in January and has stated that he would like to work in Mexico between NJPW tours. Naito teamed up with Okumura and is expected to team up with Taichi, a NJPW rookie who will be travelling to Mexico to gain experience.

Return to NJPW

No Limit (2010–2011) 

On December 5, 2009, NJPW announced that Yujiro and Naito were returning to Japan as part of their annual January 4 Tokyo Dome show called Wrestle Kingdom IV in Tokyo Dome. At the event Yujiro and Naito defeated Team 3D (Brother Ray and Brother Devon) and Bad Intentions (Giant Bernard and Karl Anderson) in a three-way hardcore match to win the IWGP Tag Team Championship. No Limit had their first title defense on February 14, 2010, defeating El Texano Jr. and El Terrible to retain the title. On April 4 at New Dimension No Limit joined New Japan's top heel stable Chaos, led by the IWGP Heavyweight Champion Shinsuke Nakamura. On May 3, 2010, at Wrestling Dontaku 2010 Naito and Takahashi lost the IWGP Tag Team Championship to Yuji Nagata and Wataru Inoue of Seigigun in a three-way match, which also included Bad Intentions (Giant Bernard and Karl Anderson).

After losing the title, Tetsuya began breaking out on his own, scoring pinfall victories over the reigning IWGP Heavyweight Champion Togi Makabe, IWGP Tag Team Champion Karl Anderson and former IWGP Heavyweight Champion Manabu Nakanishi and wrestling four-time IWGP Heavyweight Champion Hiroshi Tanahashi to a 30-minute time limit draw during the 2010 G1 Climax tournament, while also having another strong showing against Tanahashi in a losing effort at Destruction '10 on October 11. On October 24 No Limit entered the 2010 G1 Tag League. After three wins and two losses, they finished first in their block and advanced to the semifinals. On November 7, after defeating Manabu Nakanishi and Strong Man in the semifinals, No Limit was defeated in the finals of the tournament by Yuji Nagata and Wataru Inoue. On December 11, 2010, No Limit picked up a major win by defeating the TNA World Tag Team Champions, The Motor City Machine Guns, in a non–title match. On January 4, 2011, at Wrestle Kingdom V in Tokyo Dome, Naito unsuccessfully challenged Jeff Hardy for the TNA World Heavyweight Championship. On May 3, No Limit failed in their attempt to regain the IWGP Tag Team Championship from Bad Intentions. After the match Takahashi walked out on Naito.

In May 2011 Naito took part in New Japan's first tour of the United States, the Invasion Tour 2011. On May 13 in Rahway, New Jersey, he entered the tournament to determine the first ever IWGP Intercontinental Champion, defeating local worker Josh Daniels in his first round match. The following day in New York City, Naito was eliminated from the tournament in the semifinal stage by MVP. Upon their return to Japan, Takahashi turned on Naito on May 26, effectively dissolving No Limit and turning Naito face.

Singles success (2011–2015) 
On June 18 at Dominion 6.18, Takahashi defeated Tetsuya in the first match between the former members of No Limit. On June 28, Naito returned to CMLL for a one-month stint. Upon his return to Japan, Naito faced Takahashi during the first day of the 2011 G1 Climax, with Takahashi once again emerging victorious. Naito then went on to win six out of his eight remaining matches, including picking up big wins over Giant Bernard, Yoshihiro Takayama and IWGP Heavyweight Champion Hiroshi Tanahashi, to win his block and advance to the finals of the 2011 G1 Climax. However, in the end, Naito failed to win the tournament as he was defeated in the finals by Shinsuke Nakamura. On September 19, Naito defeated Takahashi in the third singles match between the two, after which he made an official challenge towards Hiroshi Tanahashi and the IWGP Heavyweight Championship. On October 10 at Destruction '11, Naito failed in his attempt to win the IWGP Heavyweight Championship from Tanahashi.

On January 4, 2012, at Wrestle Kingdom VI in Tokyo Dome, Naito faced All Japan Pro Wrestling's Keiji Mutoh in a losing effort. From late 2011 to early 2012, Naito was involved in a feud with Shinsuke Nakamura, which built to a singles match on February 12 at The New Beginning, where Naito was victorious and in the process became the number one contender to new IWGP Heavyweight Champion Kazuchika Okada. Naito received his title opportunity on March 4 in the main event of New Japan's 40th anniversary event, but was defeated by Okada. During the next months, Naito began having problems with Hiroshi Tanahashi, after he was chosen over Naito as the next challenger for Okada. In August, Naito took part in the 2012 G1 Climax tournament, during which he picked up a big win over Kazuchika Okada. However, a loss to Hirooki Goto on the final day of the tournament meant that Okada managed to overtake him in the standings, causing him to get eliminated from the tournament. Despite suffering a legitimate knee injury during the tournament, Naito continued wrestling regularly afterwards. On October 8 at King of Pro-Wrestling, Naito was defeated by Yujiro Takahashi, when the referee ended the match due to Takahashi punishing Naito's injured knee. Following the match, Naito was stretchered out of the arena. Naito underwent reconstructive knee surgery on October 16 and was expected to miss eight months of in-ring action.

On May 3, 2013, Naito made an appearance at New Japan's Wrestling Dontaku 2013 event, announcing that he would be returning to the ring on June 22, while also naming the NEVER Openweight Championship, held by Masato Tanaka, as his goal. On June 22 at Dominion 6.22, Naito defeated Takahashi in his return match. On July 20, Naito failed in his attempt to capture the NEVER Openweight Championship from Tanaka. From August 1 to 11, Naito took part in the 2013 G1 Climax. Finishing with a record of five wins and four losses, Naito clinched the number one spot in his block and advanced to the finals after a win over Karl Anderson on the final day. In the finals, Naito defeated Hiroshi Tanahashi to win the 2013 G1 Climax and earn a shot at the IWGP Heavyweight Championship. Naito, however, announced that he first wanted a rematch with Masato Tanaka for the NEVER Openweight Championship. The following day, Naito was given a contract, which granted him a shot at the IWGP Heavyweight Championship on January 4, 2014, at the Tokyo Dome. On September 29 at Destruction, Naito defeated Masato Tanaka to not only retain the contract, but to also win the NEVER Openweight Championship. On October 14 at King of Pro-Wrestling, Naito successfully defended both the title and the contract against Yujiro Takahashi. On November 9 at Power Struggle, Naito defeated Masato Tanaka to retain the NEVER Openweight Championship and solidify his spot in the main event of the January 4 Tokyo Dome show. Naito and reigning IWGP Heavyweight Champion Kazuchika Okada faced off on November 23 during the first day of the 2013 World Tag League in a match, where Naito and Mexican wrestler La Sombra were defeated by Okada and Yoshi-Hashi. Naito and La Sombra finished the tournament on December 6 with a record of three wins and three losses, failing to advance from their block. Following a disappointing fan reaction to a confrontation between Naito and Okada, New Japan announced that fans would get to vote whether they or Shinsuke Nakamura and Hiroshi Tanahashi for the IWGP Intercontinental Championship would be the true main event of the Tokyo Dome show. When the results were released on December 9, Naito and Okada had gotten only half the votes Nakamura and Tanahashi had gotten and, as a result, lost their main event spot for New Japan's biggest show of the year. On January 4, 2014, at Wrestle Kingdom 8 in Tokyo Dome, Naito failed in his title challenge against Okada. The following day, Naito entered a new feud with Tomohiro Ishii, who announced his intention of becoming the next NEVER Openweight Champion. On February 11 at The New Beginning in Osaka, Naito lost the NEVER Openweight Championship to Ishii in his third title defense.

From July 21 to August 8, Naito took part in the 2014 G1 Climax, where he finished fifth in his block with a record of five wins and five losses. On October 13 at King of Pro-Wrestling, Naito unsuccessfully challenged Okada, whom he had defeated during the G1 Climax, for his IWGP Heavyweight Championship number one contender's contract. The following month, Naito reunited with La Sombra for the 2014 World Tag League. The team finished in the middle of their block with a record of four wins and three losses. In May 2015, Naito took part in the NJPW/Ring of Honor (ROH) co-produced tour of United States and Canada, during which he unsuccessfully challenged Jay Lethal for the ROH World Television Championship at Global Wars '15.

Los Ingobernables de Japón and rise to stardom (2015–2019) 

While the rest of NJPW workers returned to Japan, Naito remained in North America, returning to Mexico and CMLL for a tour, during which he continued teaming with La Sombra as part of his Los Ingobernables stable. His tour culminated with him and La Sombra unsuccessfully challenging Negro Casas and Shocker for the CMLL World Tag Team Championship on June 21. Naito returned to NJPW the following week with a new look and persona, while also announcing that he now represented Los Ingobernables also in NJPW. From July 20 to August 14, Naito took part in the 2015 G1 Climax. Despite big early wins over A.J. Styles and eventual tournament winner Hiroshi Tanahashi, Naito finished third in his block with a record of five wins and four losses and thus failed to advance to the finals. On October 12 at King of Pro-Wrestling, Naito unsuccessfully challenged 2015 G1 Climax winner Hiroshi Tanahashi for his IWGP Heavyweight Championship contract. During the match, the returning Takaaki Watanabe was revealed as Naito's new partner, but his outside interference was stopped by Hirooki Goto and Katsuyori Shibata. Shortly afterwards, Naito and Watanabe, now dubbed "Evil", were joined by Bushi to form the Los Ingobernables de Japón stable. In December, Naito and Evil won their block in the 2015 World Tag League with a record of five wins and one loss, advancing to the finals of the tournament. On December 9, Naito and Evil were defeated in the finals by Togi Makabe and Tomoaki Honma.

On January 4, 2016, at Wrestle Kingdom 10 in Tokyo Dome, Naito was defeated by Hirooki Goto, with whom Los Ingobernables de Japón had been feuding since the previous October. Naito avenged the loss on March 12 by defeating Goto in the finals to win the 2016 New Japan Cup. On April 10 at Invasion Attack 2016, Naito defeated Kazuchika Okada with help from his Los Ingobernables de Japón stablemates Bushi, Evil and the debuting Sanada to win the IWGP Heavyweight Championship for the first time. Naito made his first successful title defense on May 3 at Wrestling Dontaku 2016 against Tomohiro Ishii. On June 19 at Dominion 6.19 in Osaka-jo Hall, Naito lost the IWGP Heavyweight Championship back to Kazuchika Okada. From July 22 to August 13, Naito took part in the 2016 G1 Climax, where he finished second in his block with a record of six wins and three losses. Naito finished tied with block winner Kenny Omega on points, but failed to advance to the finals due to losing to Omega in their head-to-head match on the final day. On September 25 at Destruction in Kobe, Naito defeated Michael Elgin to win the IWGP Intercontinental Championship for the first time. He made his first successful title defense on November 5 at Power Struggle against Jay Lethal. Naito then took part in the 2016 World Tag League, where he and Los Ingobernables member Rush finished with a record of four wins and three losses, failing to advance to the finals due to losing to block winners Tama Tonga and Tanga Loa in their final round-robin match.

On December 14, Tokyo Sports named Naito the 2016 MVP in all of Japanese professional wrestling, marking the first time since 2010 that the award was not won by either Hiroshi Tanahashi or Kazuchika Okada. Naito won the award decidedly in the first round of voting, garnering 18 of 21 votes to beat Okada and Kenny Omega. On January 4, 2017, at Wrestle Kingdom 11 in Tokyo Dome, Naito successfully defended the IWGP Intercontinental Championship against Hiroshi Tanahashi, which he followed up with another successful title defense against Michael Elgin on February 11 at The New Beginning in Osaka. On April 29 at Wrestling Toyonokuni 2017, Naito retained the IWGP Intercontinental Championship against Juice Robinson, after which he was challenged by Hiroshi Tanahashi. Naito's reign ended on June 11 at Dominion 6.11 in Osaka-jo Hall, where he was defeated by Hiroshi Tanahashi. On July 1 at G1 Special in USA, Naito took part in a tournament to determine the inaugural IWGP United States Heavyweight Champion, but was eliminated in his first round match by Tomohiro Ishii.

The following month, Naito won his block in the 2017 G1 Climax with a record of seven wins and two losses, advancing to the finals of the tournament. On August 13, Naito defeated Kenny Omega in the finals to win his second G1 Climax. On October 9 at King of Pro-Wrestling, Naito defeated Tomohiro Ishii to ensure his spot in the main event of Wrestle Kingdom 12. On December 14, Naito became the fifth wrestler to win consecutive MVP Awards from Tokyo Sports. On January 4, 2018, Naito was defeated by Okada in the main event of Wrestle Kingdom 12. The following night, at New Year Dash!! 2018, Naito was attacked by Chris Jericho.

On April 29, 2018 at Wrestling Hinokuni, Naito defeated IWGP Intercontinental Champion Minoru Suzuki to win the title for a second time. After a 5-man tag match against Suzuki-gun at Wrestling Dontaku, Naito was again attacked by Chris Jericho, setting up their anticipated match at Dominion. On June 9, 2018 at Dominion 6.9 in Osaka-jo Hall, Jericho defeated Naito to win the IWGP Intercontinental Championship ending Naito's reign at 41 days with 0 successful defenses. The following month, Naito took part in the 2018 G1 Climax, where he finished fourth in his block with a record of six wins and three losses. At Destruction in Beppu, Naito once again defeated Minoru Suzuki in a singles match. At Power Struggle, Naito first defeated Zack Sabre Jr., and then saved his stablemate Evil from an ambush by Jericho. Their rematch was set on Wrestle Kingdom 13.

At the event, Naito defeated Jericho to win the IWGP Intercontinental Championship for the third time. At New Year Dash, Suzuki-gun attacked Los Ingobernables de Japón and Taichi challenged Naito to a match for the title. At The New Beginning in Sapporo, Naito retained his title. Naito was announced to take part in 2019 New Japan Cup and faced Kota Ibushi in the first round, but lost. This led to a title match at G1 Supercard, where Naito was defeated by Ibushi. At Dominion 6.9 in Osaka-jo Hall, Naito regained the IWGP Intercontinental Championship from Ibushi.

Dual champion and Evil's betrayal (2019–present) 
Naito participated in the 2019 G1 Climax, in which he finished 2nd, with a 5-4 record, losing in the final match of the B block to the man who would go on to win the block, Jay White. Naito's loss to White led to a match between them at Destruction in Kobe, in which Naito lost the IWGP Intercontinental Championship in the night's main event. At Power Struggle, Naito came out to confront Jay White and propose a match between them at Wrestle Kingdom 14 for the IWGP Intercontinental Championship, also expressing his desire to be the first man to hold both the IWGP Intercontinental Championship and the IWGP Heavyweight Championship at the same time. White proceeded to call out both IWGP Heavyweight Champion Kazuchika Okada, and G1 Climax 29 winner Kota Ibushi. During a heated argument; Ibushi, Naito, and White conveyed their wish to be the first "Dual Champion," while Okada said that he only cared about the IWGP Heavyweight Championship. A vote was set up for fans, where they decided for a match for both championships at Wrestle Kingdom 14, which was dubbed the "Double Gold Dash". During the first night of Wrestle Kingdom 14 on January 4, 2020, Naito defeated White to win the Intercontinental Championship, before going on to defeat Okada the following night to win the Heavyweight Championship, becoming the first person to hold both championships simultaneously. After the match, Naito was attacked by Kenta. A match between Naito and Kenta was set up for The New Beginning in Osaka where both championships would be defended; Naito emerged as the victor.

On July 11, Naito came down to the ring to celebrate Evil's New Japan Cup win but would instead be attacked by his stablemate. Evil was eventually joined by members of the Bullet Club, establishing himself as a heel and defecting from Los Ingobernables de Japon for the Bullet Club. At Dominion in Osaka-jo Hall on July 12, Naito lost both championships to Evil, ending his reigns at 188 and 189 days respectively. However, Naito would win back both titles at Summer Struggle in Jingu, making him a three-time IWGP Heavyweight Champion and a record six-time IWGP Intercontinental Champion. From September to October, Naito competed in the 2020 G1 Climax in the B Block, but did not win, and finished with 12 points (six wins and three losses). At Power Struggle on November 7, Naito defeated Evil once again to retain the IWGP Heavyweight and Intercontinental Championships. During the first night of Wrestle Kingdom 15 on January 4, 2021, Naito lost the championships to Ibushi, thus ending both his reigns at 128 days and with one title defense. At Castle Attack on February 28, Naito faced Ibushi for the Intercontinental Championship, but was defeated.

On July 11, 2021 at Summer Struggle in Sapporo, Naito teamed up with Los Ingobernables de Japón stablesmate Sanada and defeated Dangerous Tekkers (Taichi and Zack Sabre Jr.) to win the IWGP Tag Team Championship, marking Naito's first tag title reign since No Limit held the title in 2010. However, they lost the titles at Wrestle Grand Slam in Tokyo Dome back to Dangerous Tekkers, ending their reign at just 14 days. Naito returned to singles competition in September, where he competed in the G1 Climax 30 tournament. However, in his opening match against Zack Sabre Jr, which he lost, Naito suffered a knee injury and was forced to forfeit the tournament. Naito returned 2 months later, to team with Sanada once again in the World Tag League, the team finished with 16 points, but losses to Dangerous Tekkers and EVIL and Yujiro Takahashi, who also finished with 16 points, stopped them advancing to the finals. At Wrestle Kingdom 16, Los Ingobernables de Japon lost to United Empire in a six-man tag-team match on Night 1, however Naito defeated Jeff Cobb on Night 2.

Naito was the first challenger for new IWGP World Heavyweight Champion Kazuchika Okada's championship, but was defeated at NJPW New Years Golden Series Naito competed in the New Japan Cup in March, defeating the likes of Hiroshi Tanahashi and Jeff Cobb to make it to the semi-finals. In the semi-finals Naito defeated Kazuchika Okada to advance to the finals, where he was defeated by Zack Sabre Jr. Naito received another World Championship match at Wrestling Dontaku, but was once again defeated by Okada. Also Dominion 6.12 in Osaka-jo Hall, Naito was announced to be a part of the G1 Climax 32 tournament in July, where he would compete in the C Block. He finished with 8 points, defeating Zack Sabre Jr on the final block match day to advance to the semi-finals. In the semi-finals, Naito lost to D Block winner Will Ospreay ending his G1 campaign.

Other media 
 Naito, along with fellow NJPW wrestlers Hiroshi Tanahashi, Hiroyoshi Tenzan, Kazuchika Okada, Satoshi Kojima and Toru Yano, appears as a member of the gang Justis in the 2016 video game Yakuza 6.
 Naito appears in the anime Tiger Mask W.
 Naito appears in the Japanese manga "HIGHER AND HIGHER! Shinnichi Gakuen," which is based on his pro-wrestling career.

Personal life 
Naito is a fan of the Hiroshima Toyo Carp baseball team and has throughout his career wrestled in red, which is the team's main color, and the team's fans have been known to sing his wrestling theme song as a chant for Hiroshima. Having been born in Tokyo, Naito originally supported the local Yomiuri Giants, but switched teams in the 1990s following Tatsunori Hara's retirement. In 2017, Naito collaborated with Hiroshima Toyo Carp for a shirt.

Naito's signature taunt, where he widens his eye with his thumb and index finger is known as "Abre los Ojos" ("Open Your Eyes"). Naito came up with the taunt in 2009 during his Mexican excursion, where local fans hurled racially-charged taunts at him for his narrow eyes. The taunt has since also been used by, among others, baseball player Shinnosuke Ogasawara and Yuki Kashiwagi of idol group AKB48.

Championships and accomplishments 

 New Japan Pro-Wrestling
 IWGP Heavyweight Championship (3 times)
 IWGP Intercontinental Championship (6 times)
 IWGP Junior Heavyweight Tag Team Championship (1 time) – with Yujiro Takahashi
 IWGP Tag Team Championship (2 times) – with Yujiro Takahashi (1) and Sanada (1) 
 NEVER Openweight Championship (1 time)
 G1 Climax (2013, 2017)
 New Japan Cup (2016)
 New Japan Pro-Wrestling Best Bout (2016) vs. Kenny Omega on August 13
 New Japan Pro-Wrestling MVP (2016)
 Nikkan Sports
 MVP Award (2016)
 Match of the Year Award (2016) vs. Kenny Omega on August 13
 Pro Wrestling Illustrated
 Ranked No. 5 of the top 500 singles wrestlers in the PWI 500 in 2020
 Sports Illustrated
 Ranked No. 4 of the top 10 wrestlers in 2020
 Tokyo Sports
 Best Bout Award (2020) 
 MVP Award (2016, 2017, 2020)
 Technique Award (2018)
 Wrestling Observer Newsletter
 Most Charismatic (2017, 2018)
 Best Gimmick (2017)  Los Ingobernables de Japón
Japan MVP (2020)
Wrestling Observer Newsletter Hall of Fame (2022)

Luchas de Apuestas record

Notes

References

External links 

 
 Tetsuya Naito's New Japan Pro-Wrestling Japanese profile
 
 

1982 births
Chaos (professional wrestling) members
IWGP Intercontinental champions
IWGP Heavyweight champions
NEVER Openweight champions
Japanese male professional wrestlers
Living people
Sportspeople from Tokyo
IWGP Junior Heavyweight Tag Team Champions
IWGP Heavyweight Tag Team Champions